Clabber (1936–1947) was a Quarter Horse stallion known as the Iron Horse for his ability to run and win match races after a day of ranch work.

Life

Clabber was registered as number 507 with the American Quarter Horse Association (or AQHA). Foaled in 1936, he was sorrel in color. His registration listing gives his sire as My Texas Dandy #4900 by *Porte Drapeau (TB). His first dam was Blondie S by Lone Star by Gold Enamel (TB). The second dam, or maternal granddam, was given as Emory Goldman by Capt. Joe. He was recorded as having been bred by Frank Smith of Big Foot, Texas. A. A. Nichols of Gilbert, Arizona registered him with the AQHA. He traced twice to Traveler on his dam's side. Sometimes his dam is given as a daughter of Uncle Jimmie Gray (TB) named Golden Girl or Golden Wheel, but the AQHA considers his dam to be Blondie S. Nichols said that as a yearling, the colt had such big feet that his friends teased him and said that the horse's feet looked like clapboards, thus the horse's name. Certainly, Clabber was no pretty horse, and had a number of conformation faults.

Racing career 
Clabber's racing record is listed as "not available" in the Quarter Racing Digest but it does list that he was awarded a Race Register of Merit and was named World Champion Quarter Running Horse for 1940–1941. In 1944, Clabber beat Painted Joe but in the Stallion Championship race only managed a dead heat with Bartender. Besides his racing career, he also was a ranch horse, and the ranch hands also competed on him in rodeo events, winning events at the local rodeos in team roping and calf roping. It was through Clabber's ability to be a ranch horse all week, run races on the weekend and maybe compete in a rodeo that he earned his nickname of "The Iron Horse."

Breeding record 
Frank Vessels Jr of Los Alamitos, California bought Clabber from Nichols in October 1944 for $5000. Vessels only got two foal crops before Clabber died. Vessels said of him "Although most of his offspring had many of his conformational defects, they also had much of his ability, desire to run, and general intelligence."

Among Clabber's foremost offspring were Chester C, Buster, Jeep, Flicka, Wagon N, Peggy N, and Tonta Gal. His leading money earner on the track was Clabbertown G, a 1946 sorrel stallion who earned $16,130.00. Twenty-six of his offspring earned Race Register of Merits. He died of a head injury on January 1, 1947, in California.

Clabber was inducted into the AQHA Hall of Fame in 1997.

Pedigree

Notes

References

 All Breed Pedigree Database Pedigree of Clabber retrieved on June 23, 2007

External links
 Clabber at Foundation Horses
 Clabber at Quarter Horse Directory
 Clabber at Quarter Horse Legends

American Quarter Horse racehorses
American Quarter Horse sires
1936 racehorse births
1947 racehorse deaths
AQHA Hall of Fame (horses)